Bidovce is a village and municipality in Košice-okolie District in the Kosice Region of Slovakia.

Genealogical resources

The records for genealogical research are available at the state archive "Statny Archiv in Kosice, Slovakia"

 Roman Catholic church records (births/marriages/deaths): 1789-1918 (parish B)
 Greek Catholic church records (births/marriages/deaths): 1788-1912 (parish B)
 Lutheran church records (births/marriages/deaths): 1776-1898 (parish B)
 Reformated church records (births/marriages/deaths): 1737-1897 (parish A)

See also
 List of municipalities and towns in Slovakia

External links

Surnames of living people in Bidovce

Villages and municipalities in Košice-okolie District